Mycolicibacterium alvei is a species of the phylum Actinomycetota (Gram-positive bacteria with high guanine and cytosine content, one of the dominant phyla of all bacteria), belonging to the genus Mycolicibacterium.

Description
Gram-positive, nonmotile and acid-fast rods (1–3 µm × 0.5–0.7 µm).

Colony characteristics
Colonies are eugonic, rough and nonpigmented.

Physiology
Colonies occur within 5 days at 30 °C (optimum temperature, no growth at 45 °C) on Löwenstein–Jensen medium and on Middlebrook 7H10 agar.
The type strain is resistant to D-cycloserine, streptomycin, isoniazid, rifampin, and thiacetazone
The type strain is susceptible to kanamycin, capreomycin and high levels of isoniazid.

Differential characteristics
Differentiation from all other mycobacterial species by its unusual mycolate pattern.

Pathogenesis
Not associated with disease.
Biosafety level 1

Type strain
First isolated from water samples, from soil and human sputum samples in Spain.

References

External links
Type strain of Mycobacterium alvei at BacDive -  the Bacterial Diversity Metadatabase

Acid-fast bacilli
alvei
Bacteria described in 1992
Actinomycetia